The WCT Tallinn Ladies Challenger, also known as the Tallinn Ladies International Challenger is an annual tournament on the women's World Curling Tour. It is held annually in November at the Tondiraba Ice Hall in Tallinn, Estonia.  

The purse for the event is €3,000, with the winning team receiving €1,200. Its event classification is 100. 

The event has been held since 2016, and has been part of the World Curling Tour since 2017.

Champions

References

Women's World Curling Tour events
Curling competitions in Estonia
Sports competitions in Tallinn
Champions Curling Tour events